Amezketa (Spanish Amézqueta) is a town located in the province of Gipuzkoa, in the Basque Autonomous Community, in the North of Spain. It is located at the foot of Txindoki.

References

External links
 Official Website Information available in Spanish and Basque.
 AMEZKETA in the Bernardo Estornés Lasa - Auñamendi Encyclopedia (Euskomedia Fundazioa) Information available in Spanish

Municipalities in Gipuzkoa